San Miguel de la Barreda is a parish (administrative division) in Siero, a municipality within the province and autonomous community of Asturias, in northern Spain. It is located along the AS-17 road.

The population is 237 (INE). 

Parish celebrations are held the first week of September.

External links
 Asturian society of economic and industrial studies, English language version of "Sociedad Asturiana de Estudios Económicos e Industriales" (SADEI)

Parishes in Siero